M. Cynthia Hipwell is an American nanotechnologist and tribologist who worked in the electronic storage and food and materials processing industries before becoming a professor of mechanical engineering at Texas A&M University, where she has been TEES Eminent Professor and is currently Oscar S. Wyatt, Jr. '45 Chair II Professor.

Education and career
Hipwell studied mechanical engineering as an undergraduate at Rice University, and completed her Ph.D. at the University of California, Berkeley.

After completing her doctorate, she worked for electronic storage company Seagate Technology, and later for food and materials processing company Bühler, Inc., where she became Vice President of Engineering. She moved to Texas A&M University in 2017.

Recognition
Hipwell was elected a member of the National Academy of Engineering in 2016, "for leadership in the development of technologies to enable areal density increases in hard disk drives". She is also a member of the National Academy of Inventors and the Academy of Medicine, Engineering and Science of Texas.

References

External links
The INVENT lab at Texas A&M, directed by Hipwell

Year of birth missing (living people)
Living people
American mechanical engineers
American women engineers
Tribologists
Rice University alumni
University of California, Berkeley alumni
Texas A&M University faculty
Members of the United States National Academy of Engineering
American women academics
21st-century American women